

Events

Pre-1600
371 BC – The Battle of Leuctra shatters Sparta's reputation of military invincibility.
 640 – Battle of Heliopolis: The Muslim Arab army under 'Amr ibn al-'As defeat the Byzantine forces near Heliopolis (Egypt).
1253 – Mindaugas is crowned King of Lithuania.
1348 – Pope Clement VI issues a papal bull protecting the Jews accused of having caused the Black Death.
1411 – Ming China's Admiral Zheng He returns to Nanjing after the third treasure voyage and presents the Sinhalese king, captured during the Ming–Kotte War, to the Yongle Emperor.
1415 – Jan Hus is condemned by the assembly of the council in the Konstanz Cathedral as a heretic and sentenced to be burned at the stake. (See Deaths section.)
1438 – A temporary compromise between the rebellious Transylvanian peasants and the noblemen is signed in Kolozsmonostor Abbey.
1483 – Richard III and Anne Neville are crowned King and Queen of England.
1484 – Portuguese sea captain Diogo Cão finds the mouth of the Congo River.
1495 – First Italian War: Battle of Fornovo: Charles VIII defeats the Holy League.
1536 – The explorer Jacques Cartier lands at St. Malo at the end of his second expedition to North America. He returns with none of the gold he expected to find. 
1557 – King Philip II of Spain, consort of Queen Mary I of England, sets out from Dover to war with France, which eventually resulted in the loss of the city of Calais, the last English possession on the continent, and Mary I never seeing her husband again.
1560 – The Treaty of Edinburgh is signed by Scotland and England.
1573 – Córdoba, Argentina, is founded by Jerónimo Luis de Cabrera.
  1573   – French Wars of Religion: Siege of La Rochelle ends.

1601–1900
1614 – Raid on Żejtun: The south east of Malta, and the town of Żejtun, suffer a raid from Ottoman forces. This was the last unsuccessful attempt by the Ottomans to conquer the island of Malta.
1630 – Thirty Years' War: Four thousand Swedish troops under Gustavus Adolphus land in Pomerania, Germany.
1685 – Battle of Sedgemoor: Last battle of the Monmouth Rebellion. Troops of King James II defeat troops of James Scott, 1st Duke of Monmouth.
1751 – Pope Benedict XIV suppresses the Patriarchate of Aquileia and establishes from its territory the Archdiocese of Udine and Gorizia.
1777 – American Revolutionary War: Siege of Fort Ticonderoga: After a bombardment by British artillery under General John Burgoyne, American forces retreat from Fort Ticonderoga, New York.
1779 – Battle of Grenada: The French defeat British naval forces during the American Revolutionary War.
1791 – At Padua, the Emperor Leopold II calls on the monarchs of Europe to join him in demanding the king of France Louis XVI's freedom.
1801 – First Battle of Algeciras: Outnumbered French Navy ships defeat the Royal Navy in the fortified Spanish port of Algeciras.
1809 – The second day of the Battle of Wagram; France defeats the Austrian army in the largest battle to date of the Napoleonic Wars.
1854 – In Jackson, Michigan, the first convention of the United States Republican Party is held.
1885 – Louis Pasteur successfully tests his vaccine against rabies on Joseph Meister, a boy who was bitten by a rabid dog.
1887 – David Kalākaua, monarch of the Kingdom of Hawaii, is forced to sign the Bayonet Constitution, which transfers much of the king's authority to the Legislature of the Kingdom of Hawaii.
1892 – Three thousand eight hundred striking steelworkers engage in a day-long battle with Pinkerton agents during the Homestead Strike, leaving ten dead and dozens wounded.

1901–present
1917 – World War I: Arabian troops led by T. E. Lawrence ("Lawrence of Arabia") and Auda ibu Tayi capture Aqaba from the Ottoman Empire during the Arab Revolt.
1918 – The Left SR uprising in Russia starts with the assassination of German ambassador Wilhelm von Mirbach by Cheka members.
1919 – The British dirigible R34 lands in New York, completing the first crossing of the Atlantic Ocean by an airship.
1933 – The first Major League Baseball All-Star Game is played in Chicago's Comiskey Park. The American League defeated the National League 4–2.
1936 – A major breach of the Manchester Bolton & Bury Canal in England sends millions of gallons of water cascading  into the River Irwell.
1937 – Spanish Civil War: Battle of Brunete: The battle begins with Spanish Republican troops going on the offensive against the Nationalists to relieve pressure on Madrid.
1939 – Anti-Jewish legislation in prewar Nazi Germany closes the last remaining Jewish enterprises.
1940 – Story Bridge, a major landmark in Brisbane, as well as Australia's longest cantilever bridge is formally opened.
1941 – The German army launches its offensive to encircle several Soviet armies near Smolensk.
1942 – Anne Frank and her family go into hiding in the "Secret Annexe" above her father's office in an Amsterdam warehouse.
1944 – Jackie Robinson refuses to move to the back of a bus, leading to a court-martial.
  1944   – The Hartford circus fire, one of America's worst fire disasters, kills approximately 168 people and injures over 700 in Hartford, Connecticut.
1947 – Referendum held in Sylhet to decide its fate in the Partition of India.
  1947   – The AK-47 goes into production in the Soviet Union.
1957 – Althea Gibson wins the Wimbledon championships, becoming the first black athlete to do so.
  1957   – John Lennon and Paul McCartney meet for the first time, as teenagers at Woolton Fete, three years before forming the Beatles.
1962 – As a part of Operation Plowshare, the Sedan nuclear test takes place.
  1962   – The Late Late Show, the world's longest-running chat show by the same broadcaster, airs on RTÉ One for the first time.
1964 – Malawi declares its independence from the United Kingdom.
1966 – Malawi becomes a republic, with Hastings Banda as its first President.
1967 – Nigerian Civil War: Nigerian forces invade Biafra, beginning the war.
1975 – The Comoros declares independence from France.
1982 – While attempting to return to Sheremetyevo International Airport, an Ilyushin Il-62 operating as Aeroflot Flight 411 crashes near Mendeleyevo, Moscow Oblast, killing all 90 people on board.
1988 – The Piper Alpha drilling platform in the North Sea is destroyed by explosions and fires. One hundred sixty-seven oil workers are killed, making it the world's worst offshore oil disaster in terms of direct loss of life.
1989 – The Tel Aviv–Jerusalem bus 405 suicide attack: Sixteen bus passengers are killed when a member of the Palestinian Islamic Jihad took control of the bus and drove it over a cliff.
1995 – In the Bosnian War, under the command of General Ratko Mladić, Serbia begins its attack on the Bosnian town of Srebrenica.
1996 – A McDonnell Douglas MD-88 operating as Delta Air Lines Flight 1288 experiences a turbine engine failure during takeoff from Pensacola International Airport, killing two and injuring five of the 147 people on board.
1997 – The Troubles: In response to the Drumcree dispute, five days of mass protests, riots and gun battles begin in Irish nationalist districts of Northern Ireland.
1998 – Hong Kong International Airport opens in Chek Lap Kok, Hong Kong, replacing Kai Tak Airport as the city's international airport.
2003 – The 70-metre Yevpatoria Planetary Radar sends a METI message (Cosmic Call 2) to five stars: Hip 4872, HD 245409, 55 Cancri (HD 75732), HD 10307 and 47 Ursae Majoris (HD 95128). The messages will arrive to these stars in 2036, 2040, 2044, and 2049, respectively.
2006 – The Nathu La pass between India and China, sealed during the Sino-Indian War, re-opens for trade after 44 years.
2013 – At least 42 people are killed in a shooting at a school in Yobe State, Nigeria.
  2013   – A Boeing 777 operating as Asiana Airlines Flight 214 crashes at San Francisco International Airport, killing three and injuring 181 of the 307 people on board.
  2013   – A 73-car oil train derails in the town of Lac-Mégantic, Quebec and explodes into flames, killing at least 47 people and destroying more than 30 buildings in the town's central area.
2022 – The Georgia Guidestones, a monument in the United States, are heavily damaged in a bombing, and are dismantled later the same day.

Births

Pre-1600
1387 – Queen Blanche I of Navarre (d. 1441)
1423 – Antonio Manetti, Italian mathematician and architect (d. 1497)
1580 – Johann Stobäus, German lute player and composer (d. 1646)

1601–1900
1623 – Jacopo Melani, Italian violinist and composer (d. 1676)
1678 – Nicola Francesco Haym, Italian cellist and composer (d. 1729)
1686 – Antoine de Jussieu, French biologist and academic (d. 1758)
1701 – Mary, Countess of Harold, English aristocrat and philanthropist (d. 1785)
1736 – Daniel Morgan, American general and politician (d. 1802)
1747 – John Paul Jones, Scottish-American captain (d. 1792)
1766 – Alexander Wilson, Scottish-American poet, ornithologist, and illustrator (d. 1813)
1782 – Maria Luisa of Spain (d. 1824)
1785 – William Hooker, English botanist and academic (d. 1865)
1789 – María Isabella of Spain (d. 1846)
1796 – Nicholas I of Russia (d. 1855)
1797 – Henry Paget, 2nd Marquess of Anglesey (d. 1869)
1799 – Louisa Caroline Huggins Tuthill, American author  (d. 1879)
1817 – Albert von Kölliker, Swiss anatomist and physiologist (d. 1905)
1818 – Adolf Anderssen, German chess player (d. 1879)
1823 – Sophie Adlersparre, Swedish publisher, writer, and women's rights activist (d. 1895)
1829 – Frederick VIII, Duke of Schleswig-Holstein (d. 1880)
1831 – Sylvester Pennoyer, American lawyer and politician, 8th Governor of Oregon (d. 1902)
1832 – Maximilian I of Mexico (d. 1867)
1837 – R. G. Bhandarkar, Indian orientalist and scholar (d. 1925)
1838 – Vatroslav Jagić, Croatian philologist and scholar (d. 1923)
1840 – José María Velasco Gómez, Mexican painter and academic (d. 1912)
1843 – John Downer, Australian politician, 16th Premier of South Australia (d. 1915)
1846 – Ángela Peralta, Mexican opera singer (d. 1883)
1856 – George Howard Earle, Jr., American lawyer and businessman (d. 1928)
1858 – William Irvine, Irish-Australian politician, 21st Premier of Victoria (d. 1943)
1865 – Émile Jaques-Dalcroze, Swiss composer and educator (d. 1950)
1868 – Princess Victoria of the United Kingdom (d. 1935)
1873 – Dimitrios Maximos, Greek banker and politician, 140th Prime Minister of Greece (d. 1955)
1877 – Arnaud Massy, French golfer (d. 1950)
1878 – Eino Leino, Finnish poet and journalist (d. 1926)
1883 – Godfrey Huggins, Prime Minister of the Federation of Rhodesia and Nyasaland (d. 1971)
1884 – Harold Stirling Vanderbilt, American businessman and sailor (d. 1970)
1885 – Ernst Busch, German field marshal (d. 1945)
1886 – Marc Bloch, French historian and academic (d. 1944)
1887 – Marc Chagall, Belarusian-French painter and poet (d. 1985)
  1887   – Annette Kellermann, Australian swimmer and actress (d. 1975)
1890 – Dhan Gopal Mukerji, Indian-American author and scholar (d. 1936)
1892 – Will James, American author and illustrator (d. 1942)
1897 – Richard Krautheimer, German-American historian and scholar (d. 1994)
1898 – Hanns Eisler, German-Austrian soldier and composer (d. 1962)
1899 – Susannah Mushatt Jones, American supercentarian (d. 2016) 
1900 – Frederica Sagor Maas, American author and screenwriter (d. 2012)
  1900   – Elfriede Wever, German Olympic runner (d. 1941)

1901–present
1903 – Hugo Theorell, Swedish biochemist and academic, Nobel Prize laureate (d. 1982)
1904 – Robert Whitney, American conductor and composer (d. 1986)
  1904   – Erik Wickberg, Swedish 9th General of The Salvation Army (d. 1996)
1905 – Juan O'Gorman, Mexican painter and architect (d. 1982)
1907 – Frida Kahlo, Mexican painter and educator (d. 1954)
  1907   – George Stanley, Canadian soldier, historian, and author, designed the flag of Canada (d. 2002)
1908 – Anton Muttukumaru, Sri Lankan general and diplomat (d. 2001)
1909 – Eric Reece, Australian politician, 32nd Premier of Tasmania (d. 1999)
1910 – René Le Grèves, French cyclist (d. 1946)
1911 – June Gale, American actress (d. 1996)
1912 – Heinrich Harrer, Austrian geographer and mountaineer (d. 2006)
  1912   – Molly Yard, American feminist (d. 2005) 
1913 – Vance Trimble, American journalist and author (d. 2021)
1914 – Vince McMahon Sr., American wrestling promoter, founded WWE (d. 1984)
  1914   – Ernest Kirkendall, American chemist and metallurgist (d. 2005)
1915 – Leonard Birchall, Royal Canadian Air Force pilot (d. 2004)
1916 – Harold Norse, American poet and author (d. 2009)
  1916   – Don R. Christensen, American animator, cartoonist, illustrator, writer and inventor (d. 2006)
1917 – Arthur Lydiard, New Zealand runner and coach (d. 2004)
1918 – Sebastian Cabot, English-Canadian actor (d. 1977)
  1918   – Herm Fuetsch, American professional basketball player (d. 2010)
  1918   – Francisco Moncion, Dominican-American ballet dancer, charter member of the New York City Ballet (d.1995)
1919 – Ernst Haefliger, Swiss tenor and educator (d. 2007)
  1919   – Edward Kenna, Australian Second World War recipient of the Victoria Cross (d. 2009)
  1919   – Ray Dowker, New Zealand cricketer (d. 2004)
1921 – Allan MacEachen, Canadian economist and politician, Deputy Prime Minister of Canada (d. 2017)
  1921   – Billy Mauch, American actor (d. 2006)
  1921   – Bobby Mauch, American actor (d. 2007)
  1921   – Nancy Reagan, American actress and activist, 42nd First Lady of the United States (d. 2016)
1922 – William Schallert, American actor; president (1979–81) of the Screen Actors Guild (d. 2016)
1923 – Wojciech Jaruzelski, Polish general and politician, 1st President of Poland (d. 2014)
1924 – Mahim Bora, Indian writer and educationist, recipients of the Padma Shri, India's fourth highest civilian honour (d. 2016)
1924 – Louie Bellson, American drummer, composer, and bandleader (d. 2009)
1925 – Merv Griffin, American actor, singer, and producer, created Wheel of Fortune and Jeopardy! (d. 2007)
  1925   – Bill Haley, American singer-songwriter and guitarist (d. 1981)
  1925   – Gazi Yaşargil, Turkish neurosurgeon and academic
1926 – Sulev Vahtre, Estonian historian and academic (d. 2007)
  1926   – Armando Silvestre, Mexican-American actor
1927 – Jan Hein Donner, Dutch chess player and journalist (d. 1988)
  1927   – Janet Leigh, American actress and author (d. 2004)
1928 – Bernard Malgrange, French mathematician
1929 – Hélène Carrère d'Encausse, French politician historian
1930 – George Armstrong, Canadian ice hockey player and coach (d. 2021)
  1930   – Ian Burgess, English racing driver (d. 2012)
1931 – Della Reese, American actress and singer (d. 2017)
  1931   – László Tábori, Hungarian runner and coach (d. 2018)
1932 – Herman Hertzberger, Dutch architect and academic
1935 – Candy Barr, American model, dancer, and actress (d. 2005)
  1935   – Tenzin Gyatso, 14th Dalai Lama
1936 – Dave Allen, Irish comedian, actor, and screenwriter (d. 2005)
1937 – Vladimir Ashkenazy, Russian-Icelandic pianist and conductor
  1937   – Ned Beatty, American actor (d. 2021)
  1937   – Gene Chandler, American singer-songwriter and producer
  1937   – Bessie Head, Botswanan writer (d. 1986)
  1937   – Michael Sata, Zambian police officer and politician, 5th President of Zambia (d. 2014)
1939 – Jet Harris, English bass player (d. 2011)
  1939   – Mary Peters, English-Irish pentathlete and shot putter
  1939   – Bruce Hunter, American swimmer (d. 2018)
1940 – Nursultan Nazarbayev, Kazakh politician, 1st President of Kazakhstan
  1940   – Jeannie Seely, Grammy Award-winning country music singer-songwriter and Grand Ole Opry member
  1940   – Siti Norma Yaakob, Malaysian lawyer and judge
1941 – David Crystal, British linguist, author, and academic
  1941   – Reinhard Roder, German footballer and manager
1943 – Tamara Sinyavskaya, Russian soprano
1944 – Gunhild Hoffmeister, German runner
1946 – George W. Bush, American businessman and politician, 43rd President of the United States
  1946   – Fred Dryer, American football player and actor
  1946   – Peter Singer, Australian philosopher and academic
  1946   – Sylvester Stallone, American actor, director, and screenwriter
1947 – Roy Señeres, Filipino diplomat and politician (d. 2016)
1948 – Nathalie Baye, French actress
  1948   – Jean-Pierre Blackburn, Canadian academic and politician, 26th Canadian Minister of Veterans Affairs
  1948   – Brad Park, Canadian-American ice hockey player and coach
1949 – Noli de Castro, Filipino journalist and politician, 14th Vice President of the Philippines
  1949   – Phyllis Hyman, American singer-songwriter and actress (d. 1995)
  1949   – Michael Shrieve, American composer, drummer, and percussionist 
1950 – John Byrne, English-American author and illustrator
1951 – Lorna Golding, Former First Lady of Jamaica
  1951   – Geoffrey Rush, Australian actor and producer
1952 – Hilary Mantel, English author and critic (d. 2022)
1953 – Nanci Griffith, American singer-songwriter and guitarist (d. 2021)
  1953   – Kaiser Kalambo, Zambian footballer and manager (d. 2014)
  1953   – Robert Ménard, French politician and former journalist
1954 – Allyce Beasley, American actress 
  1954   – Willie Randolph, American baseball player and manager
1958 – Jennifer Saunders, English actress, comedian and screenwriter
1959 – Richard Dacoury, French basketball player
1960 – Maria Wasiak, Polish businesswoman and politician, Polish Minister of Infrastructure and Development
1962 – Todd Bennett, English runner and coach (d. 2013)
  1962   – Peter Hedges, American author, screenwriter, and director
1967 – Heather Nova, Bermudian singer-songwriter and guitarist
1970 – Inspectah Deck, American rapper and producer
1972 – Daniel Andrews, Australian politician, 48th Premier of Victoria
  1972   – Laurent Gaudé, French author and playwright
  1972   – Greg Norton, American baseball player and coach
  1972   – Zhanna Pintusevich-Block, Ukrainian sprinter
1974 – Zé Roberto, Brazilian footballer
  1975   – Sebastián Rulli, Argentine-Mexican actor and model
  1975   – Amir-Abbas Fakhravar, Iranian journalist and activist
1976 – Rory Delap, English-Irish footballer
  1976   – Ioana Dumitriu, Romanian-American mathematician and academic
1977 – Max Mirnyi, Belarusian tennis player
  1977   – Makhaya Ntini, South African cricketer
1978 – Adam Busch, American actor, director, and producer
  1978   – Tamera Mowry, American actress and producer
  1978   – Tia Mowry, American actress and producer
  1978   – Kevin Senio, New Zealand rugby player
1979 – Nic Cester, Australian singer-songwriter and guitarist 
  1979   – Kevin Hart, American comedian, actor, producer, and screenwriter
1980 – Joell Ortiz, American rapper 
  1980   – Eva Green, French actress and model
1981 – Nnamdi Asomugha, American football player
  1981   – Roman Shirokov, Russian footballer
1982 – Brandon Jacobs, American football player
  1982   – Misty Upham, American actress (d. 2014)
1983 – Gregory Smith, Canadian actor, director, and producer
1984 – Zhang Hao, Chinese figure skater
1985 – Ranveer Singh, Indian film actor
1986 – David Karp, American businessman, founded Tumblr
1987 – Sophie Auster, American singer-songwriter and actress
  1987   – Manteo Mitchell, American runner
  1987   – Kate Nash, English singer-songwriter, guitarist, and actress
  1987   – Caroline Trentini, Brazilian model
1988 – Kevin Fickentscher, Swiss footballer
1990 – Magaye Gueye, French footballer
1992 – Na-Lae Han, South Korean tennis player
1992 – Manny Machado, Dominican-American baseball player

Deaths

Pre-1600
371 BC – Cleombrotus I, Spartan king
 649 – Goar of Aquitaine, French bishop
 887 – Wang Chongrong, Chinese warlord
 918 – William I, duke of Aquitaine (b. 875)
1017 – Genshin, Japanese scholar (b. 942)
1070 – Godelieve, Flemish saint (b. 1049)
1189 – Henry II, king of England (b. 1133)
1218 – Odo III, duke of Burgundy (b. 1166)
1249 – Alexander II, king of Scotland (b. 1198)
1415 – Jan Hus, Czech priest, philosopher, and reformer (b. 1369)
1476 – Regiomontanus, German mathematician and astrologer (b. 1436)
1480 – Antonio Squarcialupi, Italian composer (b. 1416)
1533 – Ludovico Ariosto, Italian poet and playwright (b. 1474)
1535 – Thomas More, English lawyer and politician, Chancellor of the Duchy of Lancaster (b. 1478)
1553 – Edward VI, king of England and Ireland (b. 1537)
1583 – Edmund Grindal, English archbishop (b. 1519)
1585 – Thomas Aufield, English priest and martyr (b. 1552)

1601–1900
1614 – Man Singh I, Rajput Raja of Amer (b. 1550)
1684 – Peter Gunning, English bishop (b. 1614)
1758 – George Howe, 3rd Viscount Howe, English general and politician (b. 1725)
1768 – Conrad Beissel, German-American religious leader (b. 1690)
1802 – Daniel Morgan, American general and politician (b. 1736)
1809 – Antoine Charles Louis de Lasalle, French general (b. 1775)
1813 – Granville Sharp, English activist (b. 1735)
1815 – Samuel Whitbread, English politician (b. 1764)
1835 – John Marshall, American captain and politician, 4th United States Secretary of State (b. 1755)
1854 – Georg Ohm, German physicist and mathematician (b. 1789)
1868 – Harada Sanosuke, Japanese captain (b. 1840)
1893 – Guy de Maupassant, French short story writer, novelist, and poet (b. 1850)

1901–present
1901 – Chlodwig Carl Viktor, German prince and chancellor (b. 1819)
1902 – Maria Goretti, Italian martyr and saint (b. 1890)
1904 – Abai Qunanbaiuly, Kazakh poet and philosopher (b. 1845)
1907 – August Johann Gottfried Bielenstein, German linguist and theologian (b. 1826)
1914 – Georges Legagneux, French aviator (b. 1882) 
1916 – Odilon Redon, French painter and illustrator (b. 1840)
1918 – Wilhelm von Mirbach, German diplomat (b. 1871)
1922 – Maria Teresia Ledóchowska, Polish-Austrian nun and missionary (b. 1863)
1932 – Kenneth Grahame, Scottish-English author (b. 1859)
1934 – Nestor Makhno, Ukrainian commander (b. 1888)
1946 – Horace Pippin, American painter (b. 1888)
1947 – Adolfo Müller-Ury, Swiss-American painter (b. 1862)
1952 – Louis-Alexandre Taschereau, Canadian lawyer and politician, 14th Premier of Quebec (b. 1867)
1954 – Cornelia Sorabji, Indian lawyer, social reformer and writer (b. 1866)
1959 – George Grosz, German painter and illustrator (b. 1893)
1960 – Aneurin Bevan, Welsh-English politician, Secretary of State for Health (b. 1897)
1961 – Scott LaFaro, American bassist (b. 1936)
  1961   – Woodall Rodgers, American lawyer and politician, Mayor of Dallas (b. 1890)
1962 – Paul Boffa, Maltese soldier and politician, 5th Prime Minister of Malta (b. 1890) 
  1962   – William Faulkner, American novelist and short story writer, Nobel Prize laureate (b. 1897)
  1962   – Joseph August, archduke of Austria (b. 1872)
1963 – George, duke of Mecklenburg (b. 1899)
1964 – Claude V. Ricketts, American admiral (b. 1906)
1966 – Sad Sam Jones, American baseball player and manager (b. 1892)
1967 – Hilda Taba, Estonian architect and educator (b. 1902)
1971 – Louis Armstrong, American singer and trumpet player (b. 1901)
1973 – Otto Klemperer, German-American conductor and composer (b. 1885)
1975 – Reşat Ekrem Koçu, Turkish historian, scholar, and poet (b. 1905)
1976 – Zhu De, Chinese general and politician, Chairman of the Standing Committee of the National People's Congress (b. 1886)
  1976   – Fritz Lenz, German geneticist and physician (b. 1887)
1977 – Ödön Pártos, Hungarian-Israeli viola player and composer (b. 1907)
1978 – Babe Paley, American socialite and fashion style icon (b. 1915)
1979 – Van McCoy, American singer-songwriter and producer (b. 1940)
1986 – Jagjivan Ram, Indian lawyer and politician, 4th Deputy Prime Minister of India (b. 1908)
1989 – János Kádár, Hungarian mechanic and politician, Hungarian Minister of the Interior (b. 1912)
1991 – Mudashiru Lawal, Nigerian footballer (b. 1954)
1992 – Marsha P. Johnson, American drag queen performer and activist (b. 1945)
1994 – Ahmet Haxhiu, Kosovan activist (b. 1932)
1995 – Aziz Nesin, Turkish author and poet (b. 1915)
1997 – Chetan Anand, Indian director, producer, and screenwriter (b. 1921)
1998 – Roy Rogers, American cowboy, actor, and singer (b. 1911)
1999 – Joaquín Rodrigo, Spanish pianist and composer (b. 1901)
2000 – Władysław Szpilman, Polish pianist and composer (b. 1911)
2002 – Dhirubhai Ambani, Indian businessman, founded Reliance Industries (b. 1932)
  2002   – John Frankenheimer, American director, producer, and screenwriter (b. 1930)
2003 – Buddy Ebsen, American actor, singer, and dancer (b. 1908)
  2003   – Çelik Gülersoy, Turkish lawyer, historical preservationist, writer and poet (b. 1930)
2004 – Thomas Klestil, Austrian politician, 10th President of Austria (b. 1932)
  2004   – Syreeta Wright, American singer-songwriter (b. 1946)
2005 – Ed McBain, American author and screenwriter (b. 1926)
  2005   – Claude Simon, Malagasy-French novelist and critic, Nobel Prize laureate (b. 1913)
2006 – Kasey Rogers, American actress (b. 1925)
2007 – Kathleen E. Woodiwiss, American author (b. 1939)
2009 – Vasily Aksyonov, Russian author and academic (b. 1932)
  2009   – Robert McNamara, American businessman and politician, 8th United States Secretary of Defense (b. 1916)
2010 – Harvey Fuqua, American singer-songwriter and producer (b. 1929)
2011 – Carly Hibberd, Australian road racing cyclist (b. 1985)
2012 – Hani al-Hassan, Palestinian engineer and politician (b. 1939)
2013 – Lo Hsing Han, Burmese businessman, co-founded Asia World (b. 1935)
2014 – Alan J. Dixon, American soldier, lawyer, and politician, 34th Illinois Secretary of State (b. 1927)
2015 – Jerry Weintraub, American film producer, and talent agent (b. 1937)
2018 – Shoko Asahara, founder of Japanese cult group Aum Shinrikyo (b. 1955)
  2019   – João Gilberto, Brazilian singer-songwriter and guitarist, pioneer of bossa nova music style (b. 1931)
2020 – Charlie Daniels, American singer-songwriter, fiddle-player and guitarist (b. 1936)
  2020   – Mary Kay Letourneau, American child rapist (b. 1962)
  2020   – Ennio Morricone, Italian composer, orchestrator, conductor, and trumpet player (b. 1928)
2022 – James Caan, American actor (b. 1940)
  2022   – Arnaldo Pambianco, Italian former professional road racing cyclist (b. 1935)
  2022   – Norah Vincent, American writer (b. 1968)

Holidays and observances
The first day of the Festival of San Fermín, which lasts until July 14. (Pamplona)
Christian feast day:
Maria Goretti
Romulus of Fiesole
July 6 (Eastern Orthodox liturgics)
Constitution Day (Cayman Islands)
Day of the Capital (Kazakhstan)
Independence Day (Comoros), celebrates the independence of the Comoros from France in 1975.
Independence Day (Malawi), celebrates the independence of Malawi from United Kingdom in 1964.
International Kissing Day (informally observed)
Jan Hus Day (Czech Republic)
Kupala Night (Poland, Russia, Belarus and Ukraine)
Statehood Day (Lithuania)
Teachers' Day (Peru)

References

External links

 
 
 

Days of the year
July